Choppy may refer to:

People
 Choppy Warburton (James Edward Warburton, 1845–1897), an English runner and cycling coach
 Baeden Choppy (born 1976), an Australian hockey player
 Chris Close (born 1959), known as Choppy, an Australian rugby league player

Helicopters
 Adams-Wilson Choppy, a homebuilt helicopter
 Showers Skytwister Choppy, an updated version

See also

Choppy and the Princess or Princess Knight, a Japanese manga series